Florence Nash (née Ryan) (October 2, 1888 — April 2, 1950) was an American actress and author. She was sister to theater and movie actor Mary Nash.

Early life
Florence was born to James H. and Ellen Frances (née McNamara) Ryan. She and her sister adopted the surname of their stepfather, Philip F. Nash, a vaudeville booking executive, who married their mother after the death of their father, a lawyer. Nash was Catholic and a lifelong Democrat.

Career
She began her acting career in 1907 and had her first hit in 1912 as Aggie Lynch in Within the Law. She was a noted theater actor and comedian in vaudeville until the 1930s (appearing in sketches including In 1999), when she moved to Hollywood to try her luck with films. Her most notable role was as "Nancy Blake" in the 1939 MGM blockbuster The Women.

She also was the author of a book of verse, June Dusk, published in 1918.

Death
 
After her retirement from acting in 1939, she spent the next decade living comfortably in Hollywood, California where she died on April 2, 1950. She was buried at Woodlawn Cemetery in Santa Monica, California.

Filmography
 Springtime (1914)
 It's a Great Life (1935)
 The Women (1939)

References

External links

 
 
Florence Nash portrait gallery NY Public Library Billy Rose collection

1888 births
1950 deaths
Actresses from New York (state)
American women writers
American film actresses
American silent film actresses
American stage actresses
Vaudeville performers
Actors from Troy, New York
20th-century American actresses
Writers from Troy, New York
American Roman Catholics
California Democrats
New York (state) Democrats